130th Street may refer to:
 130th Street (Manhattan), a street in the Harlem neighborhood of Manhattan, New York, and home to Astor Row 
 130th Street (IRT Ninth Avenue Line), a defunct station of the New York City Subway system

See also
 NE 130th Street station, a proposed station on Sound Transit's Lynnwood Link Extension in Seattle
 Northeast 130th Street Beach, a public beach in Seattle